{{Automatic taxobox
| image = Omphaloscelis lunosa01.jpg
| image_caption = Omphaloscelis lunosa
| taxon = Omphaloscelis
| authority = Hampson, 1906
}}Omphaloscelis' is a genus of moths of the family Noctuidae.

Species
 Omphaloscelis lunosa (Haworth, 1809)
 Omphaloscelis polybela'' (de Joannis, 1903)

References